Echinochlamydosporium is a fungal genus  in the Mortierellaceae family of the Zygomycota. The genus is monotypic, containing the single species Echinochlamydosporium variabile, found in China. The fungus grows on juvenile individuals of the soybean cyst nematode (Heterodera glycines).

References

External links

Fungi of Asia
Monotypic fungi genera
Zygomycota